St Catherine's Church, Preston-next-Faversham is an Anglican church in the Preston area of the town of Faversham in Kent, England.

Sir John Betjeman in the Collins Pocket Guide to English Parish Churches described St Catherine's as "high and distinguished among the railways and breweries".

The church in its current form originates from the Norman period, though there was extensive restoration work in the 1860s. It was designated as a Grade II* listed building in 1950.

References

External links 

St Catherine's Church on the Faversham website – archived in 2011
Official website – archived in 2018

Preston Next Faversham
Preston Next Faversham
Churches in Faversham
Preston Next Faversham}